The Wireless Washtenaw project was originally an ambitious plan to provide free wireless broadband access throughout Washtenaw County, Michigan by April 2008 "without a burden on taxpayers".  To accomplish this, it was to rely upon a public/ private sector partnership between the Washtenaw County government and 20/20 Communications. In March 2010, due to a failure to qualify for a certain anticipated federal stimulus grant, 20/20 Communications sold most of its operations to 123Net.
20/20 Communications however continues to be 123.net's sales representative for the Washtenaw County area via its website and sales office.

123.net has continued to maintain the Wireless Washtenaw network, and in the downtown Ann Arbor area has significantly expanded its transmission capabilities to include the 4G WiMAX microwave band.  Their 4G WiMAX service is a business class product offered outside of the original Wireless Washtenaw project.  It has also upgraded some of the network equipment of the project as well.
As of November 2010, the network provided wireless internet access options to downtown Ann Arbor, Manchester, Saline, Chelsea, and Dexter.

From 2008 through 2010 it became increasingly clear that all of the original goals of the Wireless Washtenaw program were not being achieved by the deadlines as originally stipulated in the 20/20 Communications contract. Since acquisition by 123.net, unless and until an additional source of significant funding for the program might be found, 20/20 Communications, under 123.net has restated the more realistic goals of the plan as merely hoping, "to revisit the possibility of slowly expanding the Wireless Washtenaw network sometime next summer (2011)."
One estimate for the amount of additional funding needed to provide full coverage to the county is $10,000,000.
New 'free' subscriptions to the service are no longer offered on the 20/20 website.  20/20 also no longer advertises any pricing on its website (November 2010).

Original project goals 

Washtenaw County, Michigan, has described the goals of Wireless Washtenaw to be the following; 

 Provide an economic development tool to attract and retain businesses
 Reduce the digital divide
 Improve County service delivery
 Facilitate wireless technology use for our citizens and visitors
 Create a seamless wireless infrastructure to attract and retain young professionals
 Establish a wireless broadband network without a burden on taxpayers

Original time-line objectives 

2004
 LinkMI plan – January 2004
 Leadership team developed – June 2004
 Discovery team organized – September 2004
 11 organizations involved
 Exploration teams - goal: investigate best practices
 Technology team
 Communication team
 Funding model team

2005
 Stakeholder meeting - March 28, 2005
 Request for information released - June 7, 2005
 Request for information opened - July 7, 2005
 Informational meetings with RFI respondents - July/August
 Request for information amended for additional feedback - October 12, 2005
 Master participation agreement distributed to local units - November 2, 2005
 Request for proposal released - November 29, 2005
 Pre-proposal conference - December 14, 2005

2006
 Board of commissioners approves MPA - March 1, 2006
 RFP responses due - March 7, 2006
 RFP evaluations complete - June 6, 2006
 Recommendation presented to advisory board - June 15, 2006
 BOC pilot provider and contract approval - August 2, 2006
 Provider agreement/contract finalized - September 26, 2006
 Pilot deployment - October through November 2006

2007
 Pilot evaluation - January 19, 2007
 Pilot phase complete - February 28, 2007

(The original contract with 20/20 Communications called for completion of countywide deployment by April 2008.  20/20 has explained the shortfall as being due to the nationwide economic slowdown of 2007, which caused a lack of anticipated funding sources.)

Current coverage 

In March 2007, 20/20 Communications completed the Wireless Washtenaw Pilot Phase. As of November, 2010, due to lack of funding, 123.net and 20/20 remain in the Pre-Deployment phase of setting up Wireless Washtenaw.

Ann Arbor

As of 11/17/2006, radios have been installed on street lamps or traffic signal arms on:

 Ashley and Liberty
 Main street from Washington to William
 Fourth Ave from Huron to Liberty
 Division from Huron to William
 State Street from Huron to South U.

Each radio transmits 300 to 600 feet depending on obstructions.  These radios transmit the 802.11b and g WiFi signal in the 2.4 GHz range.

Manchester

Radios were installed on the Manchester water tower in November 2006. They broadcast the pre-wimax 802.11a signal on the 5.7 GHz band in a 1.5-mile radius. 
Manchester area residents need to install a radio on their homes as well to receive and translate the signal.

Saline

There are two separate types of signals in the Saline pilot.  For home users, Radios have been installed on the Henry Street water tower. They broadcast in the 802.11a Pre-wimax WiFi signal covering an area 360 degrees for 1.5 miles.  Residents need a radio mounted on their home to receive this signal.  
 
The downtown business Saline area on US-12 also receives the 802.11b and G WiFi signal on the 2.4 GHz band.

Chelsea and Dexter

As of November 2010, the 20/20 website advertises its coverage as also including the towns of Dexter and Chelsea.

Private sector partnerships 

Washtenaw County, Michigan, issued a Request for Information on June 7, 2005; by the June 29, 2005, deadline set fourth by the county, 23 private sector corporations responded to the RFI were received.  These companies include:

 20/20 Communications
 Air Advantage Franchising Group
 Belair (with Winncom and Nomadix)
 Every://WARE
 IBM
 ITP Wireless
 Michigan Broadband Systems
 MichTel
 Motorola
 NeoReach
 OpAve
 PCS Broadband
 Provide.Net
 Quality Technologies
 RFconnect
 SBC
 Siemens
 SkyTel
 SpotFone, Inc
 Tropos Networks
 Vivato (with Pronto Networks)
 Washtenaw Wideopen Wireless (Cybernet, Synergy, IC.Net)
 Wireless Resources (Nortel, Comp-U-Ware, Airpath)

After reviewing the results of the Wireless Washtenaw RFI, the county release a Request For Proposal on November 29, 2005.

On June 15, 2006, the Wireless Washtenaw Advisory Board recommended to the county that 20/20 Communications be selected as the private sector partner for Wireless Washtenaw.

The recommendation was given final approval on August 2, 2006. In early 2010, 20/20 Communications sold its ownership share of Wireless Washtenaw to 123.net.

See also 
 Washtenaw County, Michigan

References

External links 
 Wireless Washtenaw Status: May 2010
 20/20 Communications: Wireless Washtenaw Service Representative: May 2010

Washtenaw County, Michigan
Wireless networking